The Miss Kim Lilac (Syringa pubescens subsp. patula 'Miss Kim') is a Korean lilac which was categorized by Elwyn M. Meader while stationed in Korea as an army horticulturalist.  It was supposedly named after Elwyn M. Meader's Korean helper, whose name was "Kim."

References

Syringa